Kaschgaria is a genus of flowering plants in the daisy family.

 Species
 Kaschgaria brachanthemoides (C.Winkl.) Poljakov - Xinjiang, Kazakhstan, Uzbekistan, Kyrgyzstan, Altay
 Kaschgaria komarovii (Krasch. & N.I.Rubtzov) Poljakov - Xinjiang, Kazakhstan, Mongolia, Altay

References

External links
 Photo by Pavel Filatov, Blossoming of the South Gobi desert. Kaschgaria (Kaschgaria komarovii, Asteraceae). Gurvansaikhan national park, Mongolia

Asteraceae genera
Anthemideae